Michael Mayers (29 September 1884 – 26 July 1925) was a Barbadian cricketer. He played in four first-class matches for the Barbados cricket team from 1905 to 1909.

See also
 List of Barbadian representative cricketers

References

External links
 

1884 births
1925 deaths
Barbadian cricketers
Barbados cricketers
People from Christ Church, Barbados